Big Gold Brick is a 2022 American black comedy film written and directed by Brian Petsos, in his directorial debut. It stars Emory Cohen, Andy Garcia, Megan Fox, Lucy Hale, Shiloh Fernandez, Frederick Schmidt, and Oscar Isaac. Principal photography began in May 2019 in Toronto, Canada. The film was released on February 25, 2022.

Cast
 Emory Cohen as Samuel Liston
 Andy Garcia as Floyd Deveraux
 Megan Fox as Jacqueline Deveraux, Floyd's second wife and attorney
 Lucy Hale as Lily Deveraux, Floyd's daughter from his first marriage
 Oscar Isaac as Anselm
 Shiloh Fernandez as Roy
 Leonidas Castrounis as Edward Deveraux, Floyd's son
 Frederick Schmidt as Percy
 Tevin Wolfe as Lentil "Beans" Washington

Release
In June 2021, Samuel Goldwyn Films acquired distribution rights to the film.

Reception
On Rotten Tomatoes, Big Gold Brick holds an approval rating of 20% based on 35 reviews, and an average rating of 3.40/10. The website's critics consensus reads: "Quirky to a fault,  Big Gold Brick tries and fails to use visual tricks and a crowded narrative to hide its fundamental lack of purpose."

References

External links
 
 
 

2022 films
2022 black comedy films
2022 directorial debut films
2020s English-language films
American black comedy films
Films shot in Toronto
Samuel Goldwyn Films films
2020s American films